NK Ogulin is a Croatian football club based in the town of Ogulin. The club was formerly known as NK Jedinstvo Ogulin and played in the Rijeka group in the 1952 Yugoslavian Second Division.

Cup Results
NK Ogulin last appeared in the Croatian Cup in 2014, when they lost 4:0 to Zrinjski Jurjevac.

Famous Players
Đoni Tafra, former HNK Rijeka goalkeeper who finished his career with Ogulin

Football clubs in Croatia
Association football clubs established in 1932
1932 establishments in Croatia
Sport in Karlovac County
NK Ogulin